William John Neeson  (born 7 June 1952) is an actor from Northern Ireland. He has received several accolades, including nominations for an Academy Award, a British Academy Film Award, and two Tony Awards. In 2020, he was placed 7th on The Irish Times list of Ireland's 50 Greatest Film Actors. Neeson was appointed Officer of the Order of the British Empire (OBE) in 2000.

In 1976, Neeson joined the Lyric Players' Theatre in Belfast for two years. His early film roles include Excalibur (1981), The Bounty (1984), The Mission (1986), and Husbands and Wives (1992). He rose to prominence portraying Oskar Schindler in Steven Spielberg's holocaust drama Schindler's List (1993) for which he earned an Academy Award for Best Actor nomination. He followed by starring in Nell (1994), Rob Roy (1995), Michael Collins (1996), and Les Misérables (1998). He took blockbuster roles portraying Qui-Gon Jinn in George Lucas' space opera Star Wars: Episode I – The Phantom Menace (1999), Ra's al Ghul in Batman Begins (2005) and Aslan in  The Chronicles of Narnia trilogy (2005–2010). He also starred in Martin Scorsese's Gangs of New York (2002), the romantic comedy Love Actually (2003), and the drama Kinsey (2004).

Beginning in 2009, Neeson cemented himself as an action star with the action thriller series Taken (2008–2014), The A-Team (2010), The Grey (2011), Wrath of the Titans (2012), and A Walk Among the Tombstones (2014). He is known for his collaborations in the genre with director Jaume Collet-Serra, and starred in four of his films: Unknown (2011), Non-Stop (2013), Run All Night (2015), and The Commuter (2018). He also starred in Martin Scorsese's religious epic Silence (2016), the fantasy drama A Monster Calls (2016), Steve McQueen's heist drama Widows (2018), the Coen brothers' western The Ballad of Buster Scruggs (2018), and the romantic drama Ordinary Love (2019).

Neeson is also known for his work on stage. He made his Broadway debut in 1993  with his performance as Matt Burke in the revival of Eugene O'Neill's Anna Christie earning a Tony Award for Best Actor in a Play nomination. He then starred as Oscar Wilde in David Hare's The Judas Kiss in 1998. He received his second Tony Award nomination for his performance in the 2002 Broadway revival of Arthur Miller's The Crucible.

Early life
Neeson was born in Ballymena, County Antrim, the son of cook Katherine "Kitty" Neeson (née Brown) and primary school caretaker Bernard "Barney" Neeson. Raised Catholic, he was named Liam after a local priest. The third of four siblings, he has three sisters, Elizabeth, Bernadette, and Rosaleen. He attended St Patrick's College, Ballymena from 1963 to 1967, and later recalled that his love of drama began there.

He said that growing up as a Catholic in a predominantly Protestant town made him cautious, and once said he felt like a "second-class citizen" there, but has also said he was never made to feel "inferior or even different" at the town's predominantly Protestant technical college. "It would be colourful to imagine I had a rebellious, uproarious Irish background," he has said, "but the facts were much greyer. Irish, yes. But all that nationalistic stuff, crying into your Guinness and singing rebel songs—that was never my scene." He has described himself as "out of touch" with the politics and history of Northern Ireland until becoming aware of protests by fellow students after Bloody Sunday, a massacre in Derry in 1972 during the Troubles, which encouraged him to learn more local history. In a 2009 interview, he said, "I never stop thinking about [the Troubles]. I've known guys and girls who have been perpetrators of violence and victims. Protestants and Catholics. It's part of my DNA."

At age nine, Neeson began boxing lessons at the All Saints Youth Club, and went on to win a number of regional titles before quitting at 17. He acted in school productions during his teens. His interest in acting and decision to become an actor were also influenced by Ian Paisley, founder of the Democratic Unionist Party (DUP), into whose Free Presbyterian Church of Ulster he sneaked. He said, "[Paisley] had a magnificent presence and it was incredible to watch him just Bible-thumping away... it was acting, but it was also great acting and stirring too." In 1971, he joined a physics and computer science course at Queen's University Belfast before leaving to work for the Guinness Brewery. At Queen's, he discovered a talent for football and was spotted by Seán Thomas at Bohemian FC. There was a club trial in Dublin and Neeson played one game as a substitute against Shamrock Rovers FC, but was not offered a contract.

Career
1976–1993: Early career 
After leaving university, Neeson returned to Ballymena, where he worked in a variety of casual jobs, such as a forklift operator at Guinness and a lorry driver. He also attended teacher training college for two years in Newcastle upon Tyne before again returning to his hometown. In 1976, he joined the Lyric Players' Theatre in Belfast, where he performed for two years. He got his first film experience in 1977, playing Jesus Christ and The Evangelist in the religious film Pilgrim's Progress (1978). He moved to Dublin in 1978 when he was offered a part in Ron Hutchinson's Says I, Says He, a drama about The Troubles, at the Project Arts Centre. He acted in several other Project productions and joined the Abbey Theatre (the National Theatre of Ireland). In 1980, he performed with Stephen Rea, Ray McAnally and Mick Lally, playing Doalty in Brian Friel's play Translations, the first production of Friel's and Rea's Field Day Theatre Company, first presented in the Guildhall in Derry on 23 September 1980.

In 1980, filmmaker John Boorman saw him on stage as Lennie Small in Of Mice and Men and offered him the role of Sir Gawain in the Arthurian film Excalibur. After the role, Neeson moved to London, where he continued working on stage, and in small budget films and television. He lived with actress Helen Mirren, whom he met working on Excalibur. Between 1982 and 1987, he starred in five films, most notably with Mel Gibson and Anthony Hopkins in 1984's The Bounty and Robert De Niro and Jeremy Irons in 1986's The Mission. Neeson guest-starred in the third season of the television series Miami Vice in 1986, and moved to Hollywood the next year to take higher-profile roles. He starred with Cher and Dennis Quaid in Suspect, which brought him critical acclaim. In 1988, he starred with Clint Eastwood in the fifth Dirty Harry film, The Dead Pool, as Peter Swan, a horror film director. In 1990, he had a starring role in Sam Raimi's Darkman. Although the film was successful, Neeson's subsequent years did not bring him the same recognition. In 1993, he joined Ellis Island co-star and future wife Natasha Richardson in the Broadway play Anna Christie. They also worked together in Nell, released the following year.

1993–2000: Rise to prominence 
Steven Spielberg offered Neeson the role of Oskar Schindler in his holocaust film Schindler's List after seeing him in Anna Christie on Broadway. Kevin Costner, Mel Gibson and Warren Beatty all expressed interest in the part (Beatty even auditioned), but Neeson was cast in December 1992 after auditioning for the role. He read the Keneally book and concluded that his character "enjoyed fookin' with the Nazis. In Keneally's book, it says he was regarded as a kind of a buffoon by them... if the Nazis were New Yorkers, he was from Arkansas. They don't quite take him seriously, and he used that to full effect." His critically acclaimed performance earned him a nomination for a Best Actor Oscar, and helped the film earn Best Picture of 1993. He also received BAFTA and Golden Globes nominations for the performance. He soon became an in-demand leading actor. He starred in the subsequent period pieces Rob Roy (1995) and Michael Collins (1996), the latter earning him Best Starring Role at the Venice Film Festival and another Golden Globe nomination. He starred as Jean Valjean in the 1998 adaptation of Victor Hugo's Les Misérables, and in The Haunting (1999) as Dr. David Marrow.

In 1999, Neeson starred as Jedi Master Qui-Gon Jinn in Star Wars: Episode I – The Phantom Menace. Director George Lucas cast Neeson because he considered him a "master actor, who the other actors will look up to, who has got the qualities of strength that the character demands." As the first Star Wars film to be released in 16 years, it was surrounded by media anticipation. Neeson's connection to Star Wars started in the Crown Bar, Belfast. He told Ricki Lake, "I probably wouldn't have taken the role if it wasn't for the advice of Peter King in the Crown during a Lyric reunion." Despite mixed reviews from critics and fans, The Phantom Menace was an enormous box-office success and remained the most financially successful Star Wars film (unadjusted for inflation) until Star Wars: The Force Awakens (2015). Neeson's performance as Qui-Gon received positive reviews and a Saturn Award nomination. A stock recording of his voice from The Phantom Menace can be heard during a scene in Star Wars: Episode II – Attack of the Clones (2002). Neeson was later reported to be appearing in Star Wars: Episode III – Revenge of the Sith (2005), but ultimately did not. In the animated television series Star Wars: The Clone Wars (2008–20), he voiced Qui-Gon in two episodes of the third season and one episode of the sixth season, and he also made a voice cameo as Qui-Gon in Star Wars: The Rise of Skywalker (2019). Neeson appeared as Qui-Gon in the final episode of Obi-Wan Kenobi (2022), appearing as a force ghost to Obi-Wan, in an uncredited cameo, marking his first live-action portrayal of Qui-Gon since The Phantom Menace. He later voiced Qui-Gon again for an episode of the animated Star Wars: Tales of the Jedi (2022).

2001–2007: Mainstream roles 

Neeson narrated the 2001 documentaries Journey into Amazing Caves, a short film about two scientists who travel around the world to search for material for potential cures; and The Endurance: Shackleton's Legendary Antarctic Adventure. The latter won awards at a number of film festivals including Best Documentary from both the Chicago Film Critics Association and the National Board of Review. After being nominated for a Tony Award for his role opposite Laura Linney in The Crucible, Neeson appeared with Harrison Ford in Kathryn Bigelow's 2002 submarine thriller K-19: The Widowmaker as Captain Mikhail Polenin. He was also on the cast of Martin Scorsese's Gangs of New York with Leonardo DiCaprio, Brendan Gleeson, Cameron Diaz and Daniel Day-Lewis, and played a recently widowed writer in Richard Curtis's ensemble comedy Love Actually (2003). His role as Alfred Kinsey in Kinsey again put Neeson up for nomination for a Golden Globe Award, but he lost to Leonardo DiCaprio for The Aviator.

In 2004, Neeson hosted an episode of the NBC sketch show Saturday Night Live. He starred as a redneck trucker, Marlon Weaver, in an "Appalachian Emergency Room" sketch and as a hippie in a one-off sketch about two stoners (the other played by Amy Poehler) who attempt to borrow a police dog to find their lost stash of marijuana. Despite vowing not to play any Irish stereotypes, Neeson did play a stereotypically Irish man named Lorcan McArdle in the home makeover show parody "You Call This A House, Do Ya?"

In 2005, Neeson played Godfrey of Ibelin in Ridley Scott's epic adventure Kingdom of Heaven; Ra's al Ghul, one of the main villains in Batman Begins; and Father Bernard in Neil Jordan's adaptation of Patrick McCabe's novel Breakfast on Pluto. In The Simpsons episode "The Father, the Son, and the Holy Guest Star" (2005), he voiced the kindly priest who (briefly) converts Bart and Homer to Catholicism. That same year, he gave his voice to the lion Aslan in the blockbuster fantasy film The Chronicles of Narnia: The Lion, the Witch and the Wardrobe. In 2007, he starred in the American Civil War epic Seraphim Falls.

Neeson voiced the main character's father, James, in the video game Fallout 3. Executive producer Todd Howard said, "This role was written with Liam in mind, and provides the dramatic tone for the entire game". Fallout 3, the third game in the Fallout series, was extremely well received by critics and shipped 4.7 million copies by the end of 2008, the year it was released.

In the director's commentary of the 2007 Transformers DVD, Michael Bay said he had told the animators to seek inspiration from Neeson in creating Optimus Prime's body language. Neeson appeared as Alistair Little in the BBC Northern Ireland/Big Fish Films television drama Five Minutes of Heaven, which tells the true story of a young Protestant man convicted of murdering a Catholic boy during The Troubles.

2008–present: Later success 

In 2008, Neeson starred in the action film Taken, a French-produced film also starring Famke Janssen and Maggie Grace, based on a script by Luc Besson and Robert Mark Kamen and directed by Pierre Morel. Neeson plays a retired CIA operative from the elite Special Activities Division who sets about tracking down his teenage daughter after she is kidnapped. Taken was a worldwide box-office hit, grossing $223.9 million worldwide, making almost $200 million more than its production budget. Neeson has said in interviews that he believed that Taken had put some people off the idea of actually travelling to Europe. Taken brought Neeson back into the centre of the public eye and resulted in his being cast in many more big-budget Hollywood movies. That year he also narrated the documentary Black Holes: The Other Side of Infinity and again lent his voice to Aslan in The Chronicles of Narnia: Prince Caspian (2008). He also provided a voice for Hayao Miyazaki's anime film Ponyo on the Cliff by the Sea, which received an August 2009 release.

In 2010, Neeson played Zeus in the remake of the 1981 film, Clash of the Titans. The film was a huge box-office hit, grossing $475 million worldwide. Neeson also starred in Atom Egoyan's erotic thriller Chloe, theatrically released by Sony Pictures Classics on 26 March 2010. Chloe had enjoyed commercial success and became the Canadian director's biggest money maker ever. Later the same year, he played John "Hannibal" Smith in the spin-off movie from the television series The A-Team. Neeson voiced Aslan once more in the sequel The Chronicles of Narnia: The Voyage of the Dawn Treader (2010).

In 2011, Neeson starred in the action-thriller Unknown, a German-British-American co-production of a French book filmed in Berlin in early 2010, and directed by Jaume Collet-Serra.  This film led to a collaboration between Neeson and Collet-Serra on a series of similar action films including Non-Stop (2014), Run All Night (2015) and The Commuter (2018).

Neeson reunited with Steven Spielberg with plans to star as Abraham Lincoln in the 2012 film Lincoln, based on the book Team of Rivals by Doris Kearns Goodwin. In preparation for the role, Neeson visited the District of Columbia and Springfield, Illinois, where Lincoln lived before being elected, and read Lincoln's personal letters. Neeson eventually declined the role, claiming he was "past his sell date" and had grown too old to play Lincoln. He was replaced by Daniel Day-Lewis (who in turn would win his third Academy Award for Best Actor).

In 2010, Neeson made a guest-star appearance on the Showtime series The Big C. In 2011, he played himself in BBC2's series Life's Too Short. In late 2011, Neeson was cast to play the lead character, a journalist, in a new album recording and arena production of Jeff Wayne's War of the Worlds. He replaced Richard Burton, who had posthumously appeared in the arena production through CGI animation. Neeson did not physically appear on the stage, instead playing the role through the use of 3D holography. In 2012, Neeson starred in Joe Carnahan's The Grey. The film received mostly positive reviews and Neeson's performance received critical acclaim. He also starred in Taken 2, a successful sequel to his 2008 blockbuster. That year, he once again appeared as Ra's al Ghul in a cameo appearance in The Dark Knight Rises, the third and final film in Christopher Nolan's The Dark Knight Trilogy. Dialogue from his role as Ra's al Ghul in Batman Begins was featured in the first trailer for the film.

On 31 January 2014, it was reported that Neeson would work with director Martin Scorsese again in an adaptation of the novel Silence. Neeson had a supporting role as the henchman Bad Cop/Good Cop in the animated film The Lego Movie, which was a critical and commercial success. Neeson later played Bill Marks in the 2014 action film Non-Stop. The film was released on 28 February 2014. He also appeared, uncredited, as God in the BBC2 series Rev.. Neeson stars in the 2014 film A Walk Among the Tombstones, an adaption of the best-selling novel of the same name, in which he plays former cop Matthew Scudder, a detective hired to hunt the killers of a drug dealer's wife.

During Super Bowl XLIX, Supercell did a Clash of Clans commercial with Neeson playing the game as "AngryNeeson52" and vowing revenge on his opponent "BigBuffetBoy85" while waiting for his scone at a bakery. The appearance was a parody of his role in Taken. In 2016, Neeson narrated the RTÉ One three-part documentary on the Easter Rising, 1916. In 2016, he did the voice and motion capture for the Monster in the Spanish film A Monster Calls.

Following the success of the Taken films, Neeson has become increasingly known as a star of action thriller films.  Besides his aforementioned action-thrillers made in collaboration with Collet-Serra, other recent action films starring Neeson have included The Grey, A Walk Among the Tombstones, Cold Pursuit, Honest Thief, The Marksman, The Ice Road, Blacklight and Memory.  Neeson has indicated a desire to retire from the action genre though the films have taken his acting career in a new direction.

Activism
Neeson opposes what he sees as the unrestricted right to own firearms in the U.S. and has made calls for gun control. In January 2015, he repeated his views, calling U.S. gun laws a "disgrace" in an interview with Emirati newspaper Gulf News when replying to a question about the Charlie Hebdo shootings earlier that month. In response, U.S gun manufacturer Para USA, which provided the prop weapons used by Neeson in the Taken film series, stated: "We will no longer provide firearms for use in films starring Liam Neeson and ask that our friends and partners in Hollywood refrain from associating our brand and products with his projects."

In 2014, Neeson protested against the anti-carriage horse campaign of New York City Mayor Bill de Blasio, who said he would outlaw horse-drawn carriages in Central Park once he took office. He wrote an opinion page published in The New York Times citing the carriage trade as a safe one for employees, horses, and tourists, and noted it was a livelihood for many immigrants.

Neeson narrated a video for Amnesty International in favour of the legalisation of abortion in Ireland, which some conservative and pro-life commentators claimed was "anti-Catholic".

Neeson was opposed to Brexit, stating in 2016 that it would be truly "a shame to sacrifice all the progress that has been made by the peace process regarding border controls".

In September 2017, Neeson compared the U.S. presidency of Donald Trump to the Watergate scandal of Richard Nixon: "Democracy works and no man—and certainly not the president—is above the law. He has to be accountable."

Personal life
Neeson lived with actress Helen Mirren during the early 1980s. They met while working on Excalibur (1981). Interviewed by James Lipton for Inside the Actors Studio, Neeson said Mirren was instrumental in his getting an agent.

Neeson then met actress Natasha Richardson while performing in a revival of the play Anna Christie on Broadway in 1993. They were married on 3 July 1994 and had two sons together, Micheál (born in 1995) and Daniel (born in 1996). In October 1998, they won £50,000 ($85,370) in libel damages after the Daily Mirror wrongly claimed that their marriage was suffering. They donated the money to victims of the August 1998 Omagh bombing. In August 2004, they purchased an estate in Millbrook, New York. On 18 March 2009, Richardson died when she suffered a severe head injury in a skiing accident at the Mont Tremblant Resort, northwest of Montreal. Neeson donated her organs following her death.

Neeson holds Irish, British, and American citizenship, having been naturalised as an American citizen in 2009. He primarily identifies as Irish. After taking up American citizenship, he was adamant he was not turning his back on his Irish roots. In 2009, nearly four decades after he was an undergraduate in physics and computer science at Queen's University, Belfast, it awarded him an honorary doctorate, presented to him in New York by Vice-Chancellor Professor Peter Gregson. In March 2011, he was appointed a Goodwill Ambassador for UNICEF. He is a patron of Belfast-based charity and film festival CineMagic, which helps young people get involved in the movie industry.

A heavy smoker earlier in his career, Neeson quit smoking in 2003 while working on Love Actually. When he took the role of Hannibal for the 2010 film adaptation of The A-Team, he had reservations about smoking cigars (a signature trait of the character), but agreed to do it for the film.

In June 2012, Neeson's publicist denied reports that Neeson was converting to Islam. Neeson has expressed an affection for the adhan, the Islamic call to prayer, that he grew accustomed to while filming Taken 2 in Istanbul: "By the third week, it was like I couldn't live without it. It really became hypnotic and very moving for me in a very special way. Very beautiful." He also expressed admiration for the Spiritual Exercises of Saint Ignatius of Loyola.

Neeson's mother, Kitty, died in June 2020. He was unable to return to his hometown for her funeral due to travel restrictions caused by the COVID-19 pandemic.

Social views
Neeson was criticised for his comments on Ireland's Late Late Show in January 2018, during which he described the Me Too movement as a "witch hunt" and cited Garrison Keillor's dismissal from Minnesota Public Radio as an example.

In February 2019, Neeson gained public and media controversy after a press junket interview he conducted with The Independent while promoting Cold Pursuit, a film about a father seeking revenge for his son's murder. He said that he generated his character's "primal" anger by recounting an experience he had 40 years ago, in which a female friend of his had been raped by a stranger. After learning the attacker was a black man, Neeson said that he spent a week going "up and down areas with a cosh, hoping some 'black bastard' would come out of a pub and have a go" so that he "could kill him". In the interview, he also said he was ashamed of the experience and that the things he did and said were "horrible". He said, "It's awful [...] but I did learn a lesson from it, when I eventually thought, 'What the fuck are you doing?'"

In an appearance on Good Morning America, Neeson elaborated on his comments while denying being a racist, stating that he asked for physical attributes of the rapist other than his race and that he would have done the same if the rapist was "a Scot or a Brit or a Lithuanian". He also said that he had purposely gone into "black areas of the city" but that he "did seek help" and counselling from his friends and a priest after coming to his senses. He said that the lesson of his experience was "to open up [and] to talk about these things", including toxic masculinity and the underlying "racism and bigotry" in both the U.S. and Northern Ireland. The controversy following his comments led to cancellation of the red carpet event for the premiere of Cold Pursuit. Neeson was publicly defended by Michelle Rodriguez, Whoopi Goldberg, John Barnes and Ralph Fiennes. He later appeared in the Atlanta episode "New Jazz" as a fictionalised version of himself, to examine the controversy.

 Filmography 

Awards and honours

In 2000, Neeson was offered the "Freedom of the Town of Ballymena" by the Ballymena Borough Council, but because of objections made by members of the Democratic Unionist Party regarding his comments that he had felt like a "second-class citizen" growing up as a Catholic in the town, he declined the award, citing tensions. Following the controversy, Neeson wrote a letter to the council, stating; "I will always remain very proud of my upbringing in, and association with, the town and my country of birth, which I will continue to promote at every opportunity. Indeed, I regard the enduring support over the years from all sections of the community in Ballymena as being more than sufficient recognition for any success which I may have achieved as an actor." Subsequently, on 28 January 2013, Neeson received the Freedom of the Borough from Ballymena Borough Council at a ceremony in the town.

Neeson was appointed Officer of the Order of the British Empire (OBE) by Queen Elizabeth II in her 2000 New Year Honours. The American Ireland Fund honoured Neeson with their Performing Arts Award for the great distinction he has brought to Ireland at their 2008 Dinner Gala in New York City. In 2009, at a ceremony in New York, Neeson was awarded an honorary doctorate by Queen's University, Belfast. On 9 April 2016, he was honoured with the Outstanding Contribution to Cinema Award by the Irish Film and Television Academy (IFTA) at the Mansion House, Dublin, with Irish President Michael D. Higgins presenting the award. In 2017, Neeson was listed by UK-based company Richtopia at number 74 in the list of 200 Most Influential Philanthropists and Social Entrepreneurs Worldwide. In January 2018, he was awarded the Distinguished Service for the Irish Abroad Award by Irish President Michael D. Higgins, who described it as an award "for Irish people abroad who are making a contribution to humanity".

See also
List of British Academy Award nominees and winners
List of Irish Academy Award winners and nominees
List of actors with Academy Award nominations

References

External links

 
 
 
 
 
 Liam Neeson on GQ's Actually Me''

1952 births
20th-century male actors from Northern Ireland
21st-century male actors from Northern Ireland
Alumni of Queen's University Belfast
Audiobook narrators
Expatriates from Northern Ireland in the United States
Northern Ireland emigrants to the United States
Living people
Male film actors from Northern Ireland
Male television actors from Northern Ireland
Male video game actors from Northern Ireland
Officers of the Order of the British Empire
People from Ballymena
People from County Antrim
Naturalized citizens of the United States
Redgrave family
Volpi Cup for Best Actor winners
2019 controversies in the United States